Esmé (more commonly Esme) or Esmée, including Esmee is an English first name, from the past participle of the Old French verb esmer, "to esteem", thus signifying "esteemed". Another theory is that esmer is an alternative spelling of today's aimer, "to love", thus the name is aimé, meaning "beloved", equivalent to the modern feminine first name "Amy". Originally a masculine name, Esme had become a feminine name by the mid-twentieth century.

The name was first popularised by Esmé Stewart, 1st Duke of Lennox (1542–1583), a French nobleman of Scottish origins who returned to Scotland for part of his life. However with regard to spelling (and pronunciation), on one of his surviving letters, dated 1583, he signed himself "Amy". 

Esme was among the 100 most popular baby names for girls in the UK in 2015.

Esme is also used as a short form for the Spanish feminine name Esmeralda, meaning 'emerald'.

Notable bearers

Men
In order of birth:
Esmé Stewart, 1st Duke of Lennox (1542–1583), Scottish earl of French descent
Esmé Stewart, 3rd Duke of Lennox (1579–1624), Scottish nobleman, younger son of the above
Esmé Stewart, 2nd Duke of Richmond, 5th Duke of Lennox (1649–1660), Scottish duke, grandson of 3rd Duke of Lennox
Esmé Collings (1859–1936), English photographer, miniaturist and early film pioneer
Esmé Howard, 1st Baron Howard of Penrith (1863–1939), British diplomat, Ambassador to the United States
Esmé Cecil Wingfield-Stratford (1882–1971), English historian and writer
Esme Percy (1887–1957), British actor
Esme Haywood (1900–1985), English cricketer
Esmé Gordon (1910–1993), Scottish architect
Esme Mends (born 1986), Ghanaian football player

Women
In order of birth:
Esmè Stuart, pen name of Amélie Claire Leroy (1851–1934), English writer
Esme Church (1893–1972), British actress and theatre director
Esmé Wynne-Tyson (1898–1972), English actress and writer
Esme Grant (20th-century), Jamaican politician
Esme Mackinnon (1913-1999), British skier
Esmé Hooton (1914–1992), English poet
Esme Tombleson (1917–2010), New Zealand politician
Esme Melville (1918–2006), Australian actress
Esme Langley (1919–1991), British writer
Esmée Fairbairn, eponym of British charity the Esmée Fairbairn Foundation
Esme Irwin (1931–2001), British cricket player
Esmé Emmanuel (born 1947), South African tennis player
Esme Young (born 1949), English fashion designer
Esme Steyn (born 1953), South African lawn bowler
Esmé Wiegman (born 1975), Dutch politician
Esmé Bianco (born 1982), British actress, model, and performer
Esmé Kamphuis (born 1983), Dutch bobsledder
Esmé Patterson (born 1985), American musician
Esmée Denters (born 1988), Dutch singer
Esmé Creed-Miles (born 2000), English actress

Fictional characters
Esme & Roy's eponymous character
Esmé Howe-Nevinson, a painter in Elizabeth Taylor's 1957 novel Angel. 
Esme, John Shelby's Gypsy wife in the TV series Peaky Blinders. 
Esme Macknade, a regular character in the long-running BBC Radio 4 First World War drama Home Front. 
Esme, in William Gaddis' 1955 novel The Recognitions.
Esmé, in J. D. Salinger's short story "For Esmé – with Love and Squalor".
Esmé Kipps, in Susan Hill's novel The Woman in Black.
Esmé Amarinth, in the novel The Green Carnation.
Esme Cuckoo, a mutant in the Marvel Universe.
Esme Cullen, a vampire in the Twilight series.
Esme Murray, in the sitcom Hamish Macbeth.
Esme Prince, a character in the soap opera General Hospital.
Esmé Squalor, a villainess in Lemony Snicket's book series A Series of Unfortunate Events.
Esme Vanderheusen, in the soap opera Passions.
Esme Weatherwax, a witch in the Discworld series.
Esme Watson, in the Australian TV series A Country Practice.
Anna Preston's birth mother in the novel but renamed Emily in the Ghibli film of When Marnie Was There. 
Esme Song, in the Canadian teen drama Degrassi: Next Class. 
Esmé, a name given to a murderous hyena of indeterminate gender in a Saki story.
Esme, a character in CW’s Supergirl Season 6.
Esme Lennox, the eponymous heroine of Maggie O'Farrell's 2006 novel The Vanishing Act of Esme Lennox.

See also

Edmé
Esmerelda

References

French unisex given names
Unisex given names